Rogers House may refer to:

in the United States

 William A. Rogers House, Eutaw, Alabama, listed on the National Register of Historic Places (NRHP) in Greene County
 Horace Franklin Rogers House, Fort Smith, Arkansas, NRHP-listed in Sebastian County
 Rogers House (Little Rock, Arkansas), NRHP-listed in Pulaski County
 Bob Rogers House, Searcy, Arkansas, NRHP-listed in White County
 Will Rogers House (Los Angeles, California), NRHP-listed in Los Angeles County
 John Rogers House (Branford, Connecticut), listed on the NRHP in New Haven County
John Rogers Studio, New Canaan, Connecticut, listed on the NRHP in Fairfield County
 Rogers House (Daytona Beach, Florida), NRHP-listed in Volusia County
 Rock Rogers House, Macon, Georgia, listed on the NRHP in Bibb County
 Franklin Rogers Bungalow, Paris, Idaho, listed on the NRHP in Bear Lake County
 Frederick Rogers House, Paris, Idaho, listed on the NRHP in Bear Lake County
 Orson Rogers House, Marengo, Illinois, listed on the NRHP in McHenry County
 Rogers-Knutson House, Clear Lake, Iowa, listed on the NRHP in Cerro Gordo County
 Mead-Rogers House, Abilene, Kansas, listed on the NRHP in Dickinson County
 Lon Rogers House, Ashland, Kentucky, listed on the NRHP in Boyd County
 James Rogers House (Belleview, Kentucky), NRHP-listed in Boone County
 Joseph Hale Rogers House, Lexington, Kentucky, listed on the NRHP in Fayette County
 Cleveland-Rogers House, Lexington, Kentucky, listed on the NRHP in Fayette County
 Boone Fowler Rogers Barn, Petersburg, Kentucky, listed on the NRHP in Boone
 Rogers-Downing House, Andover, Massachusetts, listed on the NRHP in Essex County
 Rogers House (Holden, Massachusetts), NRHP-listed in Worcester County
 John W. Keeney and Erena Alexander Rogers Farm, Franklin Township, Michigan, listed on the NRHP in Lenawee County
 Francis M. Rogers House, Aberdeen, Mississippi, listed on the NRHP in Monroe County
 Newell Rogers House, Laurel, Mississippi, listed on the NRHP in Jones County
 Rogers House (Silver Creek, Mississippi), listed on the NRHP in Lawrence County
 Rogers House (Kalispell, Montana), listed on the NRHP in Flathead County
George Rogers House (Portsmouth, New Hampshire), listed on the NRHP
 John Rogers House (Princeton, New Jersey), listed on the NRHP
 Nathaniel Rogers House, Bridgehampton, New York, listed on the NRHP
 Rogers Brothers Farmstead, Cape Vincent, New York, listed on the NRHP 
 John Rogers House (Huntington, New York), listed on the NRHP
 Rogers House (Huntington, New York), NRHP-listed
 Archibald Rogers Estate, Hyde Park, New York, listed on the NRHP
John S. Rogers House, New York, New York, listed on the NRHP
 Rogers-Bagley-Daniels-Pegues House, Raleigh, North Carolina, listed on the NRHP
 Rogers-Whitaker-Haywood House, Wake Crossroads, North Carolina, listed on the NRHP
 Bobbitt-Rogers House and Tobacco Manufactory District, Wilton, North Carolina, listed on the NRHP
 James Mitchell Rogers House, Winston-Salem, North Carolina, listed on the NRHP in Forsyth County
 Rogers House (Granville, Ohio), listed on the NRHP in Licking County
 Fitz Randolph-Rogers House, Hamilton, Ohio, listed on the NRHP in Ohio
 Will Rogers Hotel, Claremore, Oklahoma, listed in the NRHP in Rogers County
 Will Rogers Birthplace, Oologah, Oklahoma, listed in the NRHP
George Rogers House (Lake Oswego, Oregon), listed on the NRHP
 Colver-Rogers Farmstead, Jefferson, Pennsylvania, listed on the NRHP 
 Philip Rogers House, Warwick Township, Pennsylvania, listed on the NRHP in northern Chester County
 Joseph Rogers House (Newport, Rhode Island), listed on the NRHP
 William Rogers House (Bishopville, South Carolina), listed in the NRHP in South Carolina
 Paul H. Rogers House, Hartsville, South Carolina, listed on the NRHP in South Carolina
 Edward H. Rogers Homestead, Austin, Texas, listed on the NRHP in Travis County
 J. A. Walker House and R. B. Rogers House, Brownwood, Texas, listed on the NRHP in Brown County
 William S. Rogers House, Chappell Hill, Texas, listed in the NRHP in Washington County
 Rogers-Bell House, East Austin, Texas, listed on the NRHP in Travis County
 Rogers-O'Daniel House, Fort Worth, Texas, listed on the NRHP in Tarrant County
 Ghent W. Rogers House, Houston, Texas, listed on the NRHP in Harris County
 Rogers-Drummond House, Mount Vernon, Texas, listed on the NRHP in Franklin County
John H. and Margaretta Rogers House, Park City, Utah, listed on the NRHP in Summit County
 Rogers House (Morgantown, West Virginia), NRHP-listed in Monongalia County

See also
 George Rogers House (disambiguation)
 James Rogers House (disambiguation)
 Joseph Rogers House (disambiguation)
 John Rogers House (disambiguation)
 Rogers House 
 Will Rogers House (disambiguation)
 William Rogers House (disambiguation)
 Rodgers House (disambiguation)